Senator Hannon may refer to:

Beverly Hannon (born 1932), Iowa State Senate
Kemp Hannon (born 1946), New York State Senate
Lenn Hannon (1943–2010), Oregon State Senate
James P. Hannan (1918–1987), Michigan State Senate